
Daxing ( unless otherwised noted) may refer to:

Places in China
Daxing or Daxingcheng (Daxing City), the capital of the Sui dynasty (581–618) before 605, known as Chang'an before and after the Sui
Daxing District, a district of Beijing
Beijing Daxing International Airport
Tongren Fenghuang Airport, formerly known as Tongren Daxing Airport

Subdistricts
Daxing Subdistrict, Songtao County, in Songtao Miao Autonomous County, Guizhou
Daxing Subdistrict, Harbin, in Daowai District, Harbin, Heilongjiang
Daxing Subdistrict, Kaifeng, in Longting District, Kaifeng, Henan
Daxing Subdistrict, Shenyang, in Yuhong District, Shenyang, Liaoning

Towns
Daxing, Anhui, in Hefei, Anhui
Daxing, Chongqing, in Bishan District, Chongqing
Daxing, Guangxi, in Du'an Yao Autonomous County, Guangxi
Daxing, Tailai County, in Tailai County, Heilongjiang
Daxing, Jiangsu, in Suqian, Jiangsu
Daxing, Changling County, in Changling County, Jilin
Daxing, Dongfeng County, in Dongfeng County, Jilin
Daxing, Changtu County, in Changtu County, Liaoning
Daxing, Dandong, in Fengcheng, Liaoning
Daxing, Shandong, in Linshu County, Shandong
Daxing, Chengdu, in Pujiang County, Sichuan
Daxing, Ya'an, in Ya'an, Sichuan
Daxing, Lüchun County, in Lüchun County, Yunnan
Daxing, Ninglang County, in Ninglang Yi Autonomous County, Yunnan
Daxing, Yongshan County, in Yongshan County, Yunnan

Townships
Daxing Township, Heilongjiang, in Zhaoyuan County, Heilongjiang
Daxing Township, Heishan County, in Heishan County, Liaoning
Daxing Township, Huludao, in Huludao, Liaoning
Daxing Township, Nanchong, in Nanchong, Sichuan
Daxing Township, Qianwei County, in Qianwei County, Sichuan
Daxing Township, Songpan County (大姓乡), in Songpan County, Sichuan
Daxing Township, Tongjiang County, in Tongjiang County, Sichuan
Daxing Township, Xichang, in Xichang, Sichuan
Daxing Hui Ethnic Township, in Yanting County, Sichuan
Daxing Township, Yunnan, in Gengma Dai and Va Autonomous County, Yunnan

Historical eras
Daxing (318–322), possibly Taixing (太興), era name used by Emperor Yuan of Jin
Daxing (737–774, 781?–794) or Daeheung, era name used by Mun of Balhae

See also
大興 (disambiguation)
Daxin (disambiguation)
Tai Hing Estate, a public housing estate in Tuen Mun, New Territories, Hong Kong